Panini Tennekoon (5 February 1922 – 16 July 2007) was a renowned Sri Lankan architect. He spent most of his career as a public servant, working in the Public Works Department, serving as the country's chief architect, before running his own architectural practice, designing low-cost housing and investigating sustainable timber use in construction. He was a fellow of Sri Lankan Institute of Architects and the Royal Australian Institute of Architects.

Early life and education 
Tennekoon was educated at S. Thomas' College, Mount Lavinia.

He then joined an apprentice course in architecture run by Peradeniya University architect, Shirley de Alwis, in 1945. He was selected to join a five-year course at the Bartlett School of Architecture but decided not to travel to England and join the course due to the adverse living conditions in London at the end of the Second World War. In 1955, upon winning a Colombo Plan Scholarship to the School of Architecture at the University of Melbourne, he completed the five-year course in only three years, graduating in 1958 with a Graduate Diploma in Architectural Design. He was the first Asian to win the Wunderlich Annual Prize given by the school in recognition of general excellence by students.

Career 
In 1958, Tennekoon returned to Sri Lanka and was appointed assistant architect in the Public Works Department. In 1977, he was appointed as the chief architect. During his tenure at the Public Works department he was responsible for designing the National Library, Colombo (1976); Bandaranaike Samadhi, Horogolla; Prime Minister D. S. Senanayake's memorial, Colombo; Supreme Court Complex in Hulftsdorp (1978); Siyane Teacher Training College; teaching hospital complex at the Colombo South Hospital, Kalubowila; Kollupitiya police station; and the Department of National Archives.

In 1979 he became the chief architect of the Greater Colombo Development Authority (now known as the Urban Development Authority). Between 1991 and 1993, he was the consultant architect of the Architectural Unit of the Central Engineering Consultancy Bureau, where he was responsible for preparing the development scheme and master plan for the Lady Ridgeway Hospital for Children, and designing of the Central Engineering Consultancy Bureau premises. Tennekoon is credited with giving architecture a more central role in a culture of public commissions that were heavily centred in engineering, and using perspectival drawings to convey the importance of aesthetic aspects of buildings.

He died on 16 July 2007, at the age of 85, and was buried at Borella Cemetery.

Notable honours 
 1955 - Colombo Plan Scholarship to the School of Architecture at the University of Melbourne

 1956 - Wunderlich Annual Prize for General Excellence, University of Melbourne

 1959 - Associate Royal Institute of British Architects

 1970 - Fellow Royal Australian Institute of Architects

 1976 - Fellow Sri Lankan Institute of Architects

List of architectural works

Monuments 
 Bandaranaike Samadhi, Horagolla  

 D. S. Senanayake memorial, Independence Square, Colombo

 General Sir. John Kotelawala memorial, Colombo

 Manamperi memorial, side of road to Kataragama (1979): the memorial is a precast concrete structure adorned with a mural and which hosted a clay pot with drinking water for devotees of the nearby Kataragama Shrine.

 Aukana statue Layout, Bauddhaloka Mawatha, Colombo

 Clock tower, New Town Anuradhapura

National Parks Structures 
 Kotmotte National Park bungalow, office complex and entrance feature, at Wilpattu National Park: The structure was built with tree trunks fallen in the park, which were used to construct A-frame structural elements. Tennekoon was interested in minimising damage done to the surrounding areas when building in natural reserves.

 Gonawiddgala Park bungalow and Timirigasmankada Park Bungalow, Udawalawe National Park

 Park bungalow, Giritale National Park

 Aquarium, entrance feature, reptilium, restaurant, management office complex, Zoological Gardens, Dehiwala

Housing 
 Hostel Accommodation for Male Medical Students, Norris Canal Road 

 Hostel for Female University Students Colombo Campus, Buller’s Lane, Colombo

 Circuit Bungalow for Commissioner of National Housing, Kandy

 Public Works Department Circuit Bungalow, Arugambay 

 Tourist Guest House Complex, R. A. de Mel Mawatha, Colombo

 Low-Cost Housing for Dwellers of Low Income High-Density Housing Areas, Colombo City Suburbs (1971)

 Low-Cost House, Kumbuke (1995)

Educational Buildings 
 Academy of Administrative Studies, Longdon Place, Colombo

 Assembly hall, female teacher trainees hostel and library, Siyane Teachers Training College, Nittambuwa

 Sri Sanghabodhi Central College extension, Central Maha Vidyalaya

 Teaching Hospital complex at Colombo South General Hospital, Kalubowila

 Botany and Zoology Faculty Complex Colombo Campus, Thurstan Road, Colombo 

 St. Bridget's Convent Assembly hall, Colombo

Commercial Buildings 
 Laksala branches, Kegalla and Ratnapura

 Post Office complexes, Peradeniya and Veyangoda

 Police stations, Wadduwa, Beruwala and Kollupitiya

 Ministry of Buddha Sasana Complex, Colombo

 United Nations Development Program Complex extensions, Colombo 

 Supreme Tourist Office complex, Colombo

 Central Finance Co. Office complex, Colombo

 Department of National Archives, Reid Avenue, Colombo: composed of three circular wings, with curved façades, linked by a three-storey exhibition hall. The building presents an innovative shading design consisting of precast vertical concrete elements in front of regular glass windows. 

 Central Engineering Consultancy Bureau, Colombo 

 Central Supermarket, Pettah (1979): the multi-story complex was designed to separate spaces where fish was sold from the rest of the market, utilising a central courtyard and two tapered funnels which direct air circulation, inspired by a steam-engine passenger ship. 

 Supreme Court Complex, Hulftsdorp (1978): the buildings octagonal form was derived from the Paththirippuwa at the Temple of the Tooth, Kandy, and the roof was inspired by the traditional greeting,  'Ayubowan', with the joining of two palms.

 Secretariat complex, Kalutara 

 Provincial Council Secretariat, Anuradhapura

 Courts Complex, Vavuniya

 Lady Ridgeway Hospital for Children, Borella

 National Library, Colombo (1976): British architect, Michael Brawne, appointed by UNESCO, worked closely with Tennekoon, in designing the five-storey reference and archival library.

See also 
 Geoffrey Bawa 
 Minnette de Silva
 Valentine Gunasekara
 Justin Semarasekara

References 

1922 births
2007 deaths
Alumni of S. Thomas' College, Mount Lavinia
University of Melbourne alumni
20th-century Sri Lankan architects